Hojai riots refers to the riots that took place between Hindus and Muslims in Hojai, Assam in 1993, in the wake of the Demolition of the Babri Masjid. 90 Hindus and Muslims were killed in the riots by some supporters of the Idgah Protection Force. The incident started with a tiff between a photo shop owner and a customer. 

The riots were investigated by the Justice D Pathak Commission instituted soon after the riots.  It had submitted its report in 1995, but the report itself was not published till 2000.  Over 90 people were killed in the riots, of which 10 succumbed to police and army firings; and about 23 temples are mosques were damaged.

References 

1993 crimes in India
1993 riots
July 1993 crimes
July 1993 events in Asia
Hojai district
1990s in Assam
Riots and civil disorder in India